The siege of Fort Jesus was an attack on the Portuguese fort of Fort Jesus at Mombasa by the army of the Ya'rubid ruler of Oman, Saif I bin Sultan, from 13 March 1696 to 13 December 1698.

Siege 
The Yarubid dynasty had been expanding since the expulsion of the Portuguese from Oman in 1650. They attacked Portuguese possessions in East Africa and engaged in slave trade. In 1660 they attacked Mombasa for the first time, sacking the city, but could not capture the fort.

When the Omanis surrounded Fort Jesus in 1696 the garrison consisted of between 50 and 70 Portuguese soldiers and several hundred loyal African slaves. Hunger and disease thinned the garrison and the civilian population who had taken refuge in the fort. Queen Fatuma of Zanzibar sent three dhows full of supplies to the fort, however the dhows were captured and burned by the Omanis, forcing Fatuma to flee to the interior of the Island. No reinforcements arrived from the Portuguese until the siege was lifted in December 1696, when the Omani forces captured Fort Jesus and installed an Omani governor, then attacked Zanzibar, drove out the last Portuguese settlers, and captured Queen Fatuma. Fatuma was taken to Oman and remained there in exile for the next 12 years. While she was away, her son Hassan took the title of Mwinyi Mkuu but pledged allegiance to Oman and paid tribute. She was allowed to return to rule Unguja in 1709 as a vassal and client state of Oman for the rest of her reign.

Soon the Omanis returned and disease killed all the Portuguese soldiers. The defense was left in the hands of Sheikh Daud of Faza with seventeen of his family members, 8 African men and 50 African women. Portuguese reinforcements arrived again on September 15 and December 1697. After another year of siege, in December 1698, the garrison comprised only the Captain, nine men and a priest. The last Omani attack on December 13 captured the fort. Just seven days after its capture a Portuguese relief fleet arrived to see the fort lost. The siege had lasted almost three years. Mombasa would remain in Omani hands until 1728. With this successful siege, the whole coast of Kenya and Tanzania with Zanzibar and Pemba fell to the Omani Arabs.

References 

History of Oman
Fort Jesus
Battles involving Kenya
Conflicts in 1696
Conflicts in 1697
Conflicts in 1698